The 1991 Big South Conference men's basketball tournament took place February 28 – March 2, 1991, at the Civic Center of Anderson in Anderson, South Carolina. For the second time in their school history, Coastal Carolina won the tournament, led by head coach Russ Bergman. The Chanticleers advanced to face Jackson State in a play-in game for the right to advance to the 1991 NCAA tournament. Coastal Carolina defeated Jackson State, 78-59, to secure the Big South Conference's first ever bid to the NCAA tournament (the conference tournament's winner did not receive an automatic bid from 1986-90), and their first tournament bid in school history.

Format
All of the conference's eight members participated in the tournament, hosted at the Civic Center of Anderson. This was the first season for Davidson as a member of the conference.

Bracket

* Asterisk indicates overtime game
Source

All-Tournament Team
Tony Dunkin, Coastal Carolina
Brian Penny, Coastal Carolina
Robert Dowdell, Coastal Carolina
Keenan Mann, Augusta State
Derek Stewart, Augusta State

References

Tournament
Big South Conference men's basketball tournament
Big South Conference men's basketball tournament
Big South Conference men's basketball tournament
Big South Conference men's basketball tournament